ZGC Mechanical & Electrical Co., Ltd is a Chinese manufacturing and trading company, founded in 1998 at Changzhou, Jiangsu Province. ZGC offers brushless DC motors, stepping motors, PM DC Planetary gear motors, PM DC spur gear motors, LED drivers etc.

LED Driver 

New Plant started running on July 19, 2013 with 1000 m2 space, mainly provides led driver, lighting, electronic charger.

Motors 

ZGC invested in new production line in March, 2012. Mainly provides motor gear for variety business needs.

References

External links 
 

Companies based in Changzhou
Chinese companies established in 1998
Manufacturing companies of China
Manufacturing companies established in 1998